Eugen Gheorghe Nae (born 23 November 1974 in Periș, Romania) is a Romanian former footballer.

Career
Eugen Nae began his football career at AS Rocar București, where he played between 1995 and 1996.

In 1996, he moved to Sportul Studenţesc, another club from Bucharest, where he played a season.

In 1997, Nae signed a contract with Steaua București, but played only ten matches for the Army Men, because he was always the substitute of Martin Tudor or Vasily Khomutovsky.

He was loaned out four times during his spell at Steaua, twice at Foresta Suceava, and once at Farul Constanţa and Astra Ploieşti.

Between 2004 and 2007, Eugen played for FC Naţional until the club's relegation to Liga II.

In 2007, he signed a contract with FC Brașov.

In 2010, he retired from professional football, and signed with Unirea Urziceni, where he was appointed as assistant coach. A few months later, Steaua gave him a chance to work at the biggest Romanian football club as the new goalkeeping coach.

External links
 
 

1974 births
Living people
Romanian footballers
AFC Rocar București players
FC Steaua București players
FC Astra Giurgiu players
FC Sportul Studențesc București players
FC Brașov (1936) players
FC Progresul București players
FCV Farul Constanța players
CS Otopeni players
Romanian expatriate sportspeople in the United Arab Emirates
Expatriate football managers in the United Arab Emirates
Association football goalkeepers
Romanian football managers
FC Progresul București managers